The 63rd Primetime Emmy Awards, honoring the best in prime time television programming from June 1, 2010 until May 31, 2011, were held on Sunday, September 18, 2011, at the Nokia Theatre in Downtown Los Angeles, California. Fox televised the ceremony within the United States. Jane Lynch hosted the Emmys for the first time. The Creative Arts Emmy Awards ceremony was held on September 10.

The nominations were announced live on Thursday, July 14, 2011, at 5:40 a.m. PDT (12:40 UTC) at the Leonard H. Goldenson Theatre in North Hollywood, Los Angeles. The nominations were announced by Melissa McCarthy of Mike & Molly and Joshua Jackson of Fringe.

The biggest winner of the night was ABC's Modern Family. The series ended the event with five wins, including Outstanding Comedy Series for the second consecutive year. For the fourth time in history, the Outstanding Drama Series category was won for a fourth time, by AMC's Mad Men. It is also the third series to win four times consecutively in that category. Downton Abbey walked away with the award for Outstanding Miniseries or Movie, with four wins overall.

This year's ceremony was watched by 12.4 million people, down 8% from last year's show. The ceremony received mixed reviews from critics, with many praising the performance of Lynch as the host but criticizing the overall quality of the production, particularly the presenters and the orchestra.

Beginning this year, the Outstanding Miniseries and Outstanding Television Movie categories were merged. This was due to the continuing decline in the number of miniseries being produced; the previous two ceremonies only had two miniseries nominated. The merge was short-lived however when the separate categories returned, beginning in 2014.

Winners and nominees

Winners are listed first and highlighted in bold:

Programs

Acting

Lead performances

Supporting performances

Directing

Writing

Most major nominations
By network
 HBO – 29
 NBC – 19
 CBS – 14
 ABC – 12
 AMC – 11
 Fox – 8
 Showtime – 7

By program
Modern Family (ABC) – 11
Mildred Pierce (HBO) – 9
 Mad Men (AMC) – 7
 30 Rock (NBC) / The Good Wife (CBS) – 6

Most major awards
By network
 ABC – 5
 CBS / HBO / PBS – 4
 NBC / Comedy Central – 2

By program
 Modern Family (ABC) – 5
 Downton Abbey (PBS) – 4

Notes

Presenters
The awards were presented by the following:

In Memoriam
The annual In Memoriam segment was presented by John Shaffner and featured the Canadian Tenors performing the song "Hallelujah". The segment was extended for this ceremony, as executive producer Mark Burnett stated that "it [didn't] need to be a bummer... It can be a celebration".

 Cliff Robertson – performer
 Elizabeth Taylor – performer
 Anne Francis – performer
 James MacArthur – performer
 Peter Falk – performer
 Harold Gould – performer
 Stanley Frazen – editor
 James Arness – performer
 Janet MacLachlan – performer
 Madelyn Pugh Davis – writer
 Steve Landesberg – performer
 Blake Edwards – creator, producer
 Betty Garrett – performer
 John Cossette – producer
 Bill Erwin – performer
 Barbara Billingsley – performer
 Leslie Nielsen – performer
 Tom Bosley – performer
 Reza Badiyi – director
 Leonard Stern – director, producer, writer
 Ryan Dunn – performer
 Denise Cramsey – producer
 Frank Potenza – performer
 Bob Banner – director, producer
 Andy Whitfield – performer
 Fred Steiner – composer
 Jill Clayburgh – performer
 John Dye – performer
 Jack LaLanne – performer
 Al Masini – producer, creator
 Sada Thompson – performer
 Laura Ziskin – producer
 Don Meredith – performer
 Sherwood Schwartz – creator, writer
 Bubba Smith – performer
 Stephen J. Cannell – performer

Memorable moments

Opening number
The show opened with Jane Lynch performing a pre-taped opening number which showed the TV world as being contained inside of a large building, parodying Rear Window. Lynch walked through the building and entered the universe of shows including The Big Bang Theory, Mad Men, Parks and Recreation, MythBusters and Glee (the show of which Lynch is a cast member) among others. Lynch's lyrics satirized elements of each show and television in general. The ceremony culminated with Lynch entering the theatre and performing a short dance number, which ended with a fireworks show. The opening number received a standing ovation.

Emmytones
Throughout the night, the "Emmytones" introduced each genre in the form of a short jingle. They consisted of Zachary Levi ("Chuck"), Cobie Smulders ("How I Met Your Mother"), Kate Flannery ("The Office"), Wilmer Valderrama ("Royal Pains"), Joel McHale ("Community") and nominee Taraji P. Henson ("Person of Interest"). The Emmytones received mixed to negative reviews, with many critics citing them as unimportant and others calling them "time fillers."

Award for Outstanding Lead Actress in a Comedy Series
For the presentation of the award for Outstanding Lead Actress in a Comedy Series, each of the nominees went up to the stage in the style of a beauty pageant. The orchestra played music similar to that of a pageant as the nominees went to the stage. The winner ended up being Melissa McCarthy, who mentioned that this was "her first and best pageant ever." Both the producers and the nominees in the category gave nominee Amy Poehler credit for conceiving the idea. Nominee Martha Plimpton was also credited.

The presentation was well received critically with many critics regarding it to be the best part of the night. Once all the nominees reached the stage, they received a standing ovation. The pairing of Rob Lowe and Sofía Vergara, who presented the category, was also praised critically.

Criticism about the orchestra
For the 2011 ceremony, the producers enlisted Hype Music to provide the orchestrations. These orchestrations were universally hated by reviewers. The band played music from the Hype Music roster of artists as the winners walked to the stage, breaking the tradition of their respective program's theme song being played as they accepted their awards. The decision to do this received an overwhelmingly negative response from critics and enraged Emmy Award enthusiasts, many of whom felt as though a tradition observed since the 1st Primetime Emmy Awards had been broken. One reviewer even called this decision "one of the biggest mistakes in the ceremony's history."

References

External links
 Emmys.com list of 2011 Nominees & Winners
 Academy of Television Arts and Sciences website
 

063
Primetime Emmy Awards
Emmy Awards
2011 in Los Angeles
2011 awards in the United States
September 2011 events in the United States